Gabrio is an Italian origin word which is used as both a masculine given name and a surname. Notable people with the name include:

Given name
 Gabrio Casati (1798–1873), Italian politician
 Gabrio Castrichella (born 1972), Italian tennis player
 Gabrio Piola (1794–1850), Italian mathematician and physicist
 Gabrio Serbelloni (1509–1580), Italian army general
 Gabrio Zandonà (born 1977), Italian sailor

Surname
 Gabriel Gabrio (1887–1946), French actor 

Italian masculine given names
Italian-language surnames